Francis Fauquier (1703 – 3 March 1768) was a lieutenant governor of Virginia Colony (in what is today the United States), and served as acting governor from 1758 until his death in 1768. 

He was a noted teacher and close friend of Thomas Jefferson. As royal governor of Virginia, Fauquier often hosted lavish parties where Jefferson (then a College of William and Mary student) played his violin and drank imported wines. Fauquier County in Northern Virginia is named in his honor. Also, due to his connection to several prominent members (both student and faculty) of The College of William & Mary, a building and a secret society (The Fauquier Society) on the campus are named for him.

Background
Fauquier was born in England. His father, Dr. John Francis Fauquier, a French Huguenot born in Clairac, Lot-&-Garonne France, relocated to Britain where he worked as a financial agent and deputy master of the mint, where he worked under Sir Isaac Newton. Later in life Dr. Fauquier became director of the Bank of England and left his son a sizeable fortune. 

Around 1729, he married Catherine Dalston. They had two sons.

Like his father, Fauquier was brought up to be a renaissance man with expertise in both science and industry, with interests in the arts and charity. He became director of the South Sea Company in 1751. In that same year he also became one of the governors of the charitable Foundling Hospital for abandoned children. He was elected a Fellow of the Royal Society in 1753.

He came to the colony of Virginia as lieutenant governor in 1758, succeeding Robert Dinwiddie, and remained in that position until his death. He published several financial essays, among them the idea Raising Money for Support of the War, which was published in 1756, and served as an audition for the replacement of his Virginian predecessor.

In the absence of the governors—the Earl of Loudoun (1756–63) and Jeffery Amherst (1763–68)—he was the chief administrative officer. Instructions sent with him demanded that the office of treasurer of the colony be taken from the Speaker of the House of Burgesses, but he disobeyed these instructions and gained and maintained the friendship of the house. He commissioned in 1759 Andrew Burnaby to write a series of observations upon the state of the colonies. In 1760 he informed the government of the trend toward opposition to British policies in the colony and proposed that British tax policy be changed. In 1765, however, he dissolved the House of Burgesses when it passed a resolution against the Stamp Act. Patrick Henry was a thorn in Fauquier's side for some time; he always called Henry "young and hotheaded".

Except in combating disloyalty, he sympathized with the colonists, and was one of the ablest and most popular of the royal governors.  Fauquier died in Virginia in 1768 at the age of 65.

A residence hall at the College of William and Mary is named after Fauquier.

Works 
 An Essay on Ways and Means for Raising Money for the Support of the Present War, without Increasing the Public Debts (1756) : Fauquier wrote this essay, which generated significant public debate, in the context of the Seven Years' War with France. In it, he argued that the war would be too expensive for the government to finance by increasing taxes on manufacturers or workers, and suggested that taxes be levied on houses instead. In a second edition he added arguments in favour of a capitation tax based on estates and consumption.

See also
 Joseph Royle (publisher)
 Age of Enlightenment
 George Wythe  and  William Small, close friends and contemporaries of Fauquier

Notes

References
 The Columbia Electronic Encyclopedia, 6th ed.
 Richmond Times-Dispatch, July 7, 1935, article by Robert Douthat Meade.

External links

 Biography at Encyclopedia Virginia

1703 births
1768 deaths
Fellows of the Royal Society
Colonial governors of Virginia
English people of French descent
Huguenots